All Saints' Torresdale Episcopal Church is an Episcopal church in the Torresdale neighborhood of Philadelphia, Pennsylvania.

The church was founded in 1772, an extension of Philadelphia's Old Trinity Church. The present church building, designed by Frank Wills, was completed in 1855.

History
During the late 17th century, Church of England services were the first religious services to be held at the site of what is, today, All Saints' Torresdale Episcopal Church. First conducted in 1698, they were held in a Quaker meeting house built from hewn logs. Replaced by a brick building in 1711, the structure was further improved with the addition of pews in 1759, eventually became known as the Old Trinity Church, and remains situated in what is now Oxford Township, Pennsylvania.

By the early 1770s, however, a group of congregants came to realize that their beliefs were not completed aligned with other members of their church, and decided to begin a search for another more suitable location to worship. Writing to the Propagation of the Gospel in London on behalf of those restive congregants in 1771, Dr. William Smith secured permission to build a new facility, found land roughly five miles away in Torresdale, an area in Philadelphia County which would become part of the city of Philadelphia in 1854, and began working to make the new church a reality. Groundbreaking was held on November 3, 1772, on land provided by Christian Minnick, the building was completed, and dedication ceremonies were held on November 3, 1772. "Included in the covenant of ground from Christian Minnick," according to historians at All Saints' Episcopal, "was a stipulation that the church was not to be separated from Trinity Oxford and that the Swedish minister was to preach in it every three weeks."

Rectors
1772‐1779 Dr. William Smith
1779‐1785 No Rector
1785‐1786 William Smith (not Dr. Smith)
1786‐1791 Joseph Pilmore
1791‐1798 Dr. William Smith and others
1798‐1799 John Henry Hobart
1799‐1802 no regular Rector
1802‐1804 Charles Cotton
1804‐1805 No Rector
1805‐1806 Mr. Nankevil
1806‐1809 James Abercombie
1809‐1816 James Wiltbank
1816‐1818 No Rector
1818‐1834 George Sheets
1834‐1878 Frederick Beasley
1878‐1879 No Rector
1879‐1882 John Magruth
1882‐1886 James Bassett
1886‐1907 Rush S. Eastman
1907‐1916 Allen Van Meter
1916‐1953 Percy Brown
1953‐1960 Stuart Thomas
1960‐2003 Dr. Edward Chinn
2004‐2009 Jeffrey Liddy
2010‐2012 Stephen Snider (interim rector)
2012–2016  Rev. Dr. Bradley Hauff
2020–present Rev. Jay Walton

References

External links

19th-century Episcopal church buildings
Churches in Philadelphia
Episcopal churches in Pennsylvania
Gothic Revival architecture in Pennsylvania
Philadelphia Register of Historic Places
Churches completed in 1855
1772 establishments in Pennsylvania
Northeast Philadelphia